Dorothy Germain Porter (April 3, 1924 – July 20, 2012) was an American amateur golfer.

Born in Philadelphia, Pennsylvania, Dorothy Germain began playing golf at 11. She graduated from Beaver College (now Arcadia University), where she played field hockey. In the early 1940s, Porter won a number of Philadelphia junior and amateur golf championships, and in 1946 she captured the first of her three Pennsylvania Women's Amateurs. She won the Women's Western Amateur in 1943, 1944, and 1967.

In 1949 she won the U.S. Women's Amateur. Porter was a member of the U.S. team that won the 1950 Curtis Cup and captained the 1966 team to victory. In 1977, she became the first Women's Amateur Champion to win the U.S. Senior Women's Amateur. She went on to win the Seniors' title again in 1980, 1981, and 1983.  In 1984, she captained the winning U.S. Espirito Santo Trophy team.

Porter was inducted into the Philadelphia Sports Hall of Fame in 2008.

She was married to Mark A. Porter, an amateur golfer with whom she often played in tournaments, from 1946 until his death in 1996. She was the mother of three children.

Significant tournament wins
1943 Women's Western Amateur
1944 Women's Western Amateur
1946 Pennsylvania Women's Amateur, Philadelphia Women's Amateur
1949 U.S. Women's Amateur
1952 Pennsylvania Women's Amateur
1955 Pennsylvania Women's Amateur
1956 Philadelphia Women's Amateur
1959 Philadelphia Women's Amateur
1962 Philadelphia Women's Amateur
1967 Women's Western Amateur, New Jersey Women's Amateur
1969 Eastern Amateur, Philadelphia Women's Amateur
1970 Philadelphia Women's Amateur
1973 Philadelphia Women's Amateur
1977 U.S. Senior Women's Amateur
1980 U.S. Senior Women's Amateur
1981 U.S. Senior Women's Amateur
1983 U.S. Senior Women's Amateur, Philadelphia Women's Amateur
1992 Philadelphia Women's Amateur

Team appearances
Amateur
Curtis Cup (representing the United States): 1950 (winners), 1966 (non-playing captain, winners)

References

Further reading
 Frances Stebbins. A Champion Who Laughs. USGA Journal: Autumn, 1949.

American female golfers
Amateur golfers
Winners of ladies' major amateur golf championships
Golfers from Philadelphia
Arcadia University alumni
Deaths from pneumonia in Pennsylvania
1924 births
2012 deaths
21st-century American women